The Epstein–Barr virus nuclear antigen 3 (EBNA-3) is a family of viral proteins associated with the Epstein–Barr virus. A typical EBV genome contains three such proteins:

 EBNA-3A (EBNA-3; BLRF3-BERF1)
 EBNA-3B (EBNA-4; BERF2A-BERF2B)
 EBNA-3C (EBNA-6, EBNA-4B; BERF3-BERF4)

These genes also bind the host RBP-Jκ protein.

EBNA-3C can recruit a ubiquitin ligase and has been shown to target cell-cycle regulators such as retinoblastoma protein (pRb).

References

Viral nonstructural proteins
Epstein–Barr virus